The Namoi River snapping turtle (Myuchelys bellii ), also commonly known as Bell's turtle, the Namoi River elseya, or Bell's saw-shelled turtle, is a species of turtle in the family Chelidae. 
The species is endemic to New South Wales, Australia.

Description 
Myuchelys bellii is the largest species in the Myuchelys genus with adult males (up to 227 mm carapace length) smaller than females (up to 300 mm carapace length).  They are a uniform light to dark brown color with a broad oval shape.  Juveniles display a serrated posterior edge of the carapace this may persist into so adults but begin to smooth.  The plastron in adults is a pale yellow with dark dark patches or streaks.  Have a prominent shield on dorsal surface of the head extending posterior toward but not touching the tympanum.  Forelimbs each have five claws and the hind limbs have four claws.  Gray tail which is shorter than half the carapace length.  Hatchling have a (mean carapace length 26.7 ± 0.3 mm; mean carapace width 26.8 ± 0.6 mm, n = 16).

Etymology
The specific name, bellii, and some of the common names, are in honor of English zoologist Thomas Bell.

Geographic range
M. bellii occurs in the upper reaches of the Namoi, Gwydir, Macdonald, and Severn  Rivers in northern New South Wales, Australia.

References

Further reading
Cann J (1998). Australian Freshwater Turtles. Singapore: Beaumont Publishing. 292 pp. .

Thomson S, Georges A (2009). "Myuchelys gen nov. — a new genus for Elseya latisternum and related forms of Australian freshwater turtle (Testudines: Pleurodira: Chelidae)". Zootaxa 2053: 32–42.
Wells RW (2007). "Some taxonomic and nomenclatural considerations on the class Reptilia in Australia. A new genus of the family Chelidae from eastern Australia". Australian Biodiversity Record (3): 1-13.

External links

Bell's turtle from the Government of Queensland

Turtles of Australia
Endangered fauna of Australia
Myuchelys
Endemic fauna of Australia
Reptiles described in 1844
Taxa named by John Edward Gray
Taxonomy articles created by Polbot